Joann Sfar (born 28 August 1971) is a French comics artist, comic book creator, novelist, and film director.

Life and career
Sfar was born in Nice, the son of Lilou, a pop singer, who died when he was three, and André Sfar, a lawyer well known for prosecuting Neo-Nazis. As a result of his mother's early death, Sfar was raised by his father and maternal grandfather, a military doctor of Ukrainian origin in the Alsace-Lorraine Independent Brigade (France) during World War II. Sfar's grandfather reportedly saved the right hand of the brigade's leader, novelist André Malraux, for which he was awarded French citizenship.

A wildly prolific artist, he is considered one of the most important artists of the new wave of Franco-Belgian comics, though he has rejected the assertion that he, along with artists like Christophe Blain, Marjane Satrapi, and Lewis Trondheim, sought to create an alternative scene or a new movement in comics. Many of his comics were published by L'Association which was founded in 1990 by Jean-Christophe Menu and six other artists. He also worked with many of the group's main artists, e.g. David B. and Lewis Trondheim. The Donjon series, which he created with Trondheim, has a cult following in many countries.

Some of his comics are inspired by his Jewish heritage. Sfar is the son of Jewish parents (an Ashkenazi mother whose family was from Ukraine and a Sephardic father from Algeria). He himself says that there is Ashkenazi humor in his Professeur Bell series (loosely based on Joseph Bell), whereas Le chat du rabbin is clearly inspired by his Sephardic side. Les olives noires is a series about a Jewish child living in Israel at the time of Jesus. Like Le chat du rabbin, the series contains a lot of historical and theological information.

His main influences are Fred and André Franquin, as well as Marc Chagall, Chaïm Soutine, Will Eisner, Hugo Pratt and John Buscema.

From 2009 to 2010, Sfar wrote and directed Gainsbourg: Vie Héroïque, a biopic of the illustrious French songwriter and singer, of whom Sfar is a self-confessed fanatic. The film, which draws substantially on Sfar's abilities as a comic book artist through its extensive use of fantasy artwork, animation and puppetry, was released in 2010 to general critical acclaim.

Sfar's book L’Eternel has been adapted for a live-action drama entitled Monsters’ Shrink by Canal plus.

Partial bibliography

In English 
Klezmer: Tales of the Wild East, First Second Books, New York, 2006.
Vampire Loves, First Second Books, New York, 2006.
Sardine in Outer Space, 6 volumes, with Emmanuel Guibert, First Second Books, New York, 2006–2008.
The Professor's Daughter, with Emmanuel Guibert, First Second Books, New York, 2007.
The Rabbi's Cat, Pantheon, 2007.
The Rabbi's Cat 2, Pantheon, 2008.
, First Second Books, New York, 2008.
 Dungeon (since 1998, with Lewis Trondheim and collective)
The Little Prince (Comic Adaptation), Houghton Mifflin Harcourt, New York, 2010.
Pascin, Uncivilized Books, 2016.

In French

 Petrus Barbygère (with Pierre Dubois, scenario)
L'elficologue (1996, Delcourt)
Le croquemitaine d'écume (1997, Delcourt)
 Les Potamoks (with José-Luis Munuera, art)
1. Terra Incognita (1996, Delcourt)
2. Les fontaines rouges (1996, Delcourt)
3. Nous et le désert (1997, Delcourt)
 La Fille du professeur (1997, with Emmanuel Guibert (art), Dupuis)
Published in English by First Second Books as The Professor's Daughter (2007), 
 Donjon (since 1998, with Lewis Trondheim and collective)
 Le petit monde du Golem (1998, L'Association)
 Troll (with Olivier Boiscommun, art)
3. Mille et un ennuis (1999, Delcourt)
 Professeur Bell (from #3, with Hervé Tanquerelle, art)
1. Le mexicain à deux têtes (1999, Delcourt)
2. Les poupées de Jérusalem (2000, Delcourt)
3. Le cargo du Roi Singe (2002, Delcourt)
4. Promenade des Anglaises (2003, Delcourt)
5. L'Irlande à bicyclette (2006, Delcourt)
 Urani (2000, with David B, Dargaud)
 Grand Vampire
1. Cupidon s'en fout (2001, Delcourt)
2. Mortelles en tête (2002, Delcourt)
3. Transatlantique en solitaire (2002, Delcourt)
4. Quai des brunes (2003, Delcourt)
Books 1-4 published in English as Vampire Loves (2006, First Second)
5. La Communauté des magiciens (2004, Delcourt)
6. Le peuple est un Golem (2005, Delcourt)
 Les olives noires (with Emmanuel Guibert, art)
1. Pourquoi cette nuit est-elle différente des autres nuits? (2001, Dupuis)
2. Adam Harishon (2002, Dupuis)
3. Tu ne mangeras pas le chevreau dans le lait de sa mère (2003, Dupuis)
 Le chat du rabbin
1. La Bar-Mitsva (2002, Dargaud)
2. Le Malka des Lions (2002, Dargaud)
3. L'exode (2003, Dargaud)
Books 1-3 published in English as The Rabbi's Cat (2005, Pantheon)
4. Le Paradis Terrestre (2005, Dargaud)
5. Jérusalem d'Afrique (2006, Dargaud)
Books 4-5 published in English as The Rabbi's Cat 2 (2008, Pantheon)
6. Tu n'auras pas d'autre dieu que moi (2015, Dargaud)
 Klezmer
1. Conquête de l'Est (2005, Gallimard)
2. Bon anniversaire Scylla (2006, Gallimard)
3. Tous des voleurs! (2007, Gallimard)
4. Trapèze volant! (2012, Gallimard )
5. Kishinev-des-fous (2014, Gallimard )
 Chagall en Russie
1. Première partie (2010, Gallimard )
2. Seconde partie (2011, Gallimard )

Filmography

Novels
L'éternel (2013, Albin Michel)
Le Plus Grand Philosophe de France (2014, Albin Michel)

Awards
1998: Award for First Comic Book and René Goscinny Award at the Angoulême International Comics Festival, France
2000: Nominated for Best Comic Book and for the Youth Award (9 to 12 years) at the Angoulême International Comics Festival
Nominated for the Best Long Comic Strip at the Haxtur Awards Spain
Nominated for Best International Writer at the Max & Moritz Prizes, Germany
2001: Nominated for Best Scenario and for the Humour Award at the Angoulême International Comics Festival
2002: Nominated for Best Artwork and the Canal BD Award at the Angoulême International Comics Festival
2003: Oecumenic Jury Award and Polish award at the Angoulême International Comics Festival
Nominated for Best Comic Book, for the Canal BD Award, and for the Prix de la critique at the Angoulême International Comics Festival
2004: Grand Prix de la ville d'Angoulême: 30th anniversary prize, France
Award for Best Youth Album (7 to 8 years) at the Angoulême International Comics Festival
Best International Series at the Prix Saint-Michel, Belgium
Nominated for Best Series at the Angoulême International Comics Festival
Best International Writer at the Max & Moritz Prizes, Germany
2005: Nominated for Best Artwork at the Angoulême International Comics Festival
2006: Best U.S. Edition of Foreign Material at the Eisner Awards, United States
Nominated for the Audience Award and for Best Series at the Angoulême International Comics Festival
2007: Sproing Award, for Best Foreign translated material, Rabbinerens katt (Le chat du rabbin), Norway
Nominated for Outstanding Series at the Ignatz Awards, United States

References

 Joann Sfar albums Bedetheque 

Footnotes

External links

 
Le petit monde de Joan Sfar 
Le vaste monde de Joann Sfar 
Joann Sfar biography on Lambiek Comiclopedia
Joann Sfar interview on BDParadisio 
Joann Sfar interview on Parutions 
Joann Sfar interview on NPR

1971 births
Living people
21st-century French Jews
Artists from Nice
French comics artists
French comics writers
Jewish artists
École des Beaux-Arts alumni
Officiers of the Ordre des Arts et des Lettres
French film directors
French male screenwriters
French screenwriters
French film producers
Grand Prix de la ville d'Angoulême winners
French people of Algerian-Jewish descent
French people of Ukrainian-Jewish descent